General elections were held in Zanzibar on 20 March 2016. The 2016 election was conducted as a re-run of the annulled 2015 Zanzibari general election. Only the Zanzibari President, Zanzibar House of Representatives and local legislative elections were part of the re-run.

The election had a seemingly low turnover compared to previous elections as the opposition had boycotted the re-run. The opposition criticize the government in rigging the system against them after the election they believed to be victorious was annulled in 2015.

Due to the boycott, Ali Mohamed Shein won the presidency by a landslide and continued his second term.

Results

President

House of Representatives

References 

2016 elections in Tanzania
2016
October 2016 events in Africa
2016